The Oath of Stephan Huller (German: Der Eid des Stephan Huller) is a 1912 novel by the German writer Felix Hollaender.

Adaptations
It has been made into films on five occasions:
 The Oath of Stephan Huller, a 1912 film directed by Viggo Larsen
 The Oath of Stephan Huller, a 1921 film directed by Reinhard Bruck
 Variety, a 1925 film directed by Ewald Andre Dupont
 Variety, a 1935 film directed by Nicholas Farkas (also as French-language film version )
 Drei vom Varieté, a 1954 film directed by Kurt Neumann

References

Bibliography
 Goble, Alan. The Complete Index to Literary Sources in Film. Walter de Gruyter, 1999.

1912 German-language novels
1912 German novels
Novels by Felix Hollaender
German novels adapted into films